Pass It on Down is the thirteenth studio album from American country music band Alabama,  released in 1990. Singles released from the album were the title track, "Here We Are", "Down Home", "Forever's as Far as I'll Go" and "Jukebox in My Mind". "I Ain't Got No Business Doing Business Today" is a cover of Razzy Bailey.

It peaked at No. 3 on the Billboard Country Albums charts and No. 57 on the Billboard 200.

Track listing

Note: The last three tracks were not added to the cassette version.

Production 
 Joe Galante – A&R direction 
 Alabama – producers
 Larry Michael Lee – producer 
 Josh Leo – producer 
 Steve Marcantonio – engineer (1-8, 10, 11)
 Jim Cotton – engineer (9), mixing (9)
 John Estes – engineer (12), mixing (12)
 Jeff Giedt – second engineer (1-8, 10, 11), mix assistant (1-8, 10, 11)
 George Marino – mastering at Sterling Sound (New York City, New York)
 Lauren Koch – production coordinator 
 Mary Hamilton – art direction 
 Thomas Ryan Design – design 
 Jim "Señor" McGuire – photography

Personnel

Alabama 
 Jeff Cook – electric guitar, fiddle, backing vocals, lead vocals (9, 12)
 Randy Owen – acoustic guitar, lead vocals (1-7, 10)
 Teddy Gentry – bass guitar, backing vocals, lead vocals (8, 11)

Mark Herndon, Alabama's drummer, does not play on the album.

Additional Musicians 
 Bill Cuomo – keyboards
 Biff Watson – keyboards, acoustic guitar
 Bernie Leadon – acoustic guitar, banjo
 Josh Leo – electric guitar
 John Willis – electric guitar
 Kenny Bell – high-string guitar
 Glenn Worf – bass guitar
 Craig Krampf – drums, percussion 
 Sam Bush – fiddle, mandolin
 Rob Hajacos – fiddle
 Mike Haynes – trumpet
 Bobby G. Taylor – oboe
 John Catchings – cello

Kids Choir
 Kristin DeLauer – choir conductor
 Benji Cowart
 Jeremy Cowart
 Lara Gardner 
 Tommy Gardner
 Heather Holland 
 Shannon Love
 Susannah Smith
 Ben Voltz
Heather Voltz
Heidi Voltz

Chart performance

Weekly charts

Year-end charts

Singles

Certifications

Notes 

1990 albums
RCA Records albums
Alabama (American band) albums
Albums produced by Josh Leo